Nirav Dinesh Shah (born 1977) is an American epidemiologist, economist and attorney. He received both a Juris Doctor and a Doctor of Medicine degree from the University of Chicago and worked as an economist and epidemiologist at the Cambodian Ministry of Health. Shah practiced law at Sidley Austin before being appointed as the director of the Illinois Department of Public Health, serving in that role until 2019. Shah is currently the director of the Maine Center for Disease Control and Prevention and was the public face of Maine's response to the COVID-19 pandemic, holding regular televised press conferences beginning in early March 2020.  In January 2023 he was appointed the Principal Deputy Director at the U.S. Centers for Disease Control and Prevention.

Early life and education
Shah was born in 1977 to Indian immigrants to the United States and grew up in Wisconsin. He attended the University of Louisville where he majored in psychology and biology, receiving a Bachelor of Science in 1999.

After college, Shah studied economics at Oxford University and enrolled in medical school at the University of Chicago in 2000. Shah completed his Juris Doctor in 2007 and his Doctor of Medicine in 2008, both from the University of Chicago, and was a recipient of The Paul & Daisy Soros Fellowships for New Americans.

Career

Cambodian Ministry of Health
In 2001, Shah accepted a Henry Luce Scholar fellowship in Phnom Penh, Cambodia, working for the Ministry of Health as an economist and epidemiologist. His work included outbreak investigation and management, studying the cost effectiveness of public health programs, efforts to curb the distribution of counterfeit drugs, and combatting corruption in the public health system. By the 2003 conclusion of his experience there, Shah was the chief economist at the Ministry.

While in Cambodia, Shah aided the response to the SARS and Avian influenza outbreaks. In a March 2021 interview, he credited his experiences in Cambodia, as well as his ongoing communication with colleagues in Southeast Asia, with his ability to help prepare Maine for COVID-19 as its state CDC director, especially relating to the early procurement of personal protective equipment.

At the conclusion of the fellowship, Shah returned to the University of Chicago where he continued to work with the Cambodian government. While completing both medical and law school, he regularly videoconferenced with colleagues in Southeast Asia and occasionally traveled back to Cambodia.

Illinois
Following medical school, Shah worked as a health care attorney at Sidley Austin LLP in Chicago from 2008 to 2015.

In 2015, Illinois governor Bruce Rauner appointed Shah director of the Illinois Department of Public Health. During his tenure, Shah worked on initiatives combatting the opioid crisis in Illinois, addressing childhood lead poisoning, and reducing maternal and infant mortality.

In August 2015, an outbreak of Legionnaires' disease resulted in 13 deaths and 74 infections at the Illinois Veterans' Home in Quincy, Illinois. Shah was among several state officials heavily criticized for their response to the outbreak, and a 2019 state audit report of the incident indicated that the state CDC did not visit the facility until the 12th day of the outbreak. Although Shah maintains that the agency followed all federal guidelines and moved quickly: "The Illinois Department of Public Health (IDPH) did not go on-site at Quincy Veterans’ Home until midday on Monday, August 24. That was nearly three days (approximately 67 hours) after the 2nd case was confirmed late in the afternoon on August 21. The site visit focused on one building where the two confirmed cases were located." according to the State of Illinois Performance Audit by Frank J. Mautino, Auditor General. "During the 2015 outbreak, auditors determined that there was limited communication between IDPH and the Quincy Veterans’ Home staff. IDPH officials often did not know the seriousness of the problem at the Quincy Veterans’ Home."

Illinois senators Dick Durbin and Tammy Duckworth called for Shah's resignation, but Shah remained in his position until Rauner lost his re-election bid in 2018. In April 2020, the State of Illinois reached a $6.4 million settlement agreement with several families of veterans who died in the outbreak.

Maine and COVID-19

In June 2019, Maine governor Janet Mills appointed Shah director of the Maine Centers for Disease Control and Prevention. He immediately sought to fill more than 100 vacancies within the department. A few weeks after he began, a group of more than 200 asylum seekers arrived in Portland, Maine, and were temporarily housed at the Portland Exposition Building. In his first public actions as CDC director, Shah visited the facility, dispatched public health nurses to vaccinate the families and conduct health screenings, and worked with local healthcare providers to provide basic needs.

Beginning March 9, 2020, Shah began delivering daily press conferences regarding the status of the COVID-19 pandemic and the Maine CDC's preparedness. As the pandemic developed, Shah received praise for his communication style, delivering information using measured, detailed and simple answers, real-life examples, and effective metaphors devoid of scientific jargon. For example, when asked to detail proper hand washing techniques to prevent the spread of COVID-19, Shah explained “Wash your hands as if you have just sliced a bag of jalapeño peppers and now need to take out your contact lenses.”

Shah embraced three principles for his regular briefings: Be truthful, answer questions directly, and "acknowledge the statistics and numbers without overlooking the human element." Public health experts praised his enduring compassion as he consistently reminded viewers that each case number and death represented a family member, friend and neighbor. Shah also frequently included song lyrics and Dad jokes in an attempt to bring appropriate levity to his pandemic reports.

Shah's communication style and public face led to a significant following throughout Maine: A "Fans of Dr. Nirav Shah" Facebook page reached over 35,000 members. Stickers, T-shirts and mugs with Shah's likeness and the slogan "In Shah We Trust" and "Keep Calm and Listen to Dr. Shah" were printed and sold to benefit local nonprofits. Local confectioner Wilbur's of Maine produced "Shah bars" with his photo on the wrapper, and an "In Shah We Trust" electronic road sign was erected in Topsham, Maine.

In early 2021, Shah became president of the Association of State and Territorial Health Officials, and he prioritized states' preparation for COVID-19 vaccine rollouts nationwide.

U.S. Centers for Disease Control 
In January 2023 he was appointed the Principal Deputy Director at the U.S. Centers for Disease Control and Prevention.

Personal life
Shah and his wife Kara Palamountain, a research professor at Northwestern University, are avid home cooks. Shah speaks a few languages: English, Khmer, Gujarati, and some Spanish.

References

External links
Nirav D. Shah on Twitter
Nirav D. Shah on Instagram
Maine Center for Disease Control & Prevention
Nirav D. Shah, The Teaching of Law in Medical Education; AMA Journal of Ethics, 2008

Living people
American epidemiologists
American physicians
American physicians of Indian descent
1970s births
University of Louisville alumni
University of Chicago alumni
Centers for Disease Control and Prevention people
American infectious disease physicians
American lawyers
American economists
State cabinet secretaries of Illinois
People associated with Sidley Austin